Albina Kelmendi (born 27 January 1998) is a Kosovo-Albanian singer and songwriter. She rose to fame after placing as the runner-up on the fourth series of The Voice of Albania in 2014. Kelmendi and her family are set to represent Albania at Eurovision 2023 with the song Duje.

Early life 
Albina Kelmendi was born in Pejë, Kosovo (then part of FR Yugoslavia). She studied clarinet and piano at the Halit Kasapolli music school in her hometown, and started performing together with her family under the name Family Band.

Career

2014–2021: The Voice of Albania and Top Fest 
In 2014, she auditioned for the fourth series of The Voice of Albania. After getting chair turns from all four coaches, she joined Team Elsa. She finished as the runner-up of the season.

The following year, she took part in the twelfth edition of Top Fest, where she presented the song "Nuk ka ma mire".

2022–present: Nana loke, Festivali i Këngës, and Eurovision Song Contest 
In June 2022, Albina Kelmendi released her debut album, Nana loke. In December of the same year, she and five members of her family took part in the Festivali i Këngës 61 as Albina & Familja Kelmendi, where they presented the song "Duje". While coming in second place on the final night, the result of which was decided by a jury, the public vote chose her as the Albanian representative at the Eurovision Song Contest 2023 in Liverpool, United Kingdom.

Discography

Studio albums

Singles

As lead artist

Annotations

References 

Kosovo Albanians
Albanian pop musicians
1998 births
Living people
People from Peja
Eurovision Song Contest entrants for Albania
Eurovision Song Contest entrants of 2023